XHJH-FM is a radio station on 92.9 FM in Xalapa, Veracruz, Mexico, known as and owned by Radio Cañón.

History

XEJH-AM received its concession in 1980. It was owned by Luis Ignacio Santibañez Flores and broadcast on 1460 kHz. It migrated to FM in 2012.

In August 2021, the ABC Radio name was dropped after Organización Editorial Mexicana sold the group to NTR Medios de Comunicación.

References

Radio stations in Veracruz